Juliet Anne Virginia Stevenson,  (born 30 October 1956) is an English actor of stage and screen. She is known for her role in the film Truly, Madly, Deeply (1991), for which she was nominated for the BAFTA Award for Best Actress in a Leading Role. Her other film appearances include Emma (1996), Bend It Like Beckham (2002), Mona Lisa Smile (2003), Being Julia (2004) and Infamous (2006).

Stevenson has starred in numerous Royal Shakespeare Company and National Theatre productions, including Olivier Award nominated roles in Measure for Measure (1984), Les Liaisons Dangereuses (1986), and Yerma (1987). For her role as Paulina in Death and the Maiden (1991–92), she won the 1992 Olivier Award for Best Actress. Her fifth Olivier nomination was for her work in the 2009 revival of Duet for One. She has also received three nominations for the BAFTA TV Award for Best Actress: for A Doll's House (1992), The Politician's Wife (1995) and Accused (2010). Other stage roles include The Heretic (2011) and Happy Days (2014).

Early life 
Stevenson was born in Kelvedon, Essex, England, the daughter of Virginia Ruth (née Marshall), a teacher, and Michael Guy Stevenson, an army officer. Stevenson's father was assigned a new posting every two and a half years. When Stevenson was nine, she attended Berkshire's Hurst Lodge School, and she was later educated at the independent St Catherine's School in Bramley, near Guildford in Surrey, and at the Royal Academy of Dramatic Art (RADA). Stevenson was part of the 'new wave' of actors to emerge from the Academy. Others included Jonathan Pryce, Bruce Payne, Alan Rickman, Anton Lesser, Kenneth Branagh, Imelda Staunton and Fiona Shaw. This led to a stage career starting in 1978 with the Royal Shakespeare Company.

Career 
Although she has gained fame through her television and film work and has often undertaken roles for BBC Radio, she is known as a stage actress. Significant stage roles include her performances as Isabella in Measure for Measure, Madame de Tourvel in Les Liaisons Dangereuses, Anna in the UK premiere of Burn This in 1990 and Paulina in Death and the Maiden at the Royal Court theatre and the West End (1991–92). For the last she was awarded the 1992 Laurence Olivier Award for Best Actress.

In the 1987 TV film Life Story, Stevenson played the part of scientist Rosalind Franklin, for which she won a Cable Ace award. She played the leading role in the Anthony Minghella film Truly, Madly, Deeply (1991) and her roles in The Secret Rapture (1993), Emma (1996), Bend It Like Beckham (2002) and Mona Lisa Smile (2003). She has more recently starred in Pierrepoint (2006), Infamous (2006) as Diana Vreeland and Breaking and Entering (2006) as Rosemary, the therapist. In 2003, she played the mother of an autistic child in the television film Hear the Silence, a film promoting the now debunked claims of Andrew Wakefield that the MMR vaccine was responsible for autism in children. The film makers and Stevenson were criticised as Wakefield's professionalism was already seriously in doubt.

In 2009, she starred in ITV's A Place of Execution. The role won her the Best Actress Dagger at the 2009 Crime Thriller Awards. She performs as a book reader, and has recorded all of Jane Austen's novels as unabridged audiobooks, as well as a number of other novels, such as Lady Windermere's Fan, Hedda Gabler, Stories from Shakespeare, and To the Lighthouse. She received lifetime achievement prize at Women in Film And TV awards.

Personal life 
Stevenson married her long-time partner, British anthropologist Hugh Brody, in 2021. They have a daughter  and a son.

She is an atheist but considers herself a spiritual and superstitious person.

In 1992 she appeared in a political broadcast for the Labour Party.

In 2008 she campaigned on behalf of refugee women with a reading of "Motherland" at the Young Vic. She is patron of the UK registered charity LAM Action, which provides support, information and encouragement to patients with Lymphangioleiomyomatosis (LAM) and their families, and raises funds to advance research into LAM. Stevenson is an Amnesty Ambassador  and patron of the refugee charity Young Roots.

On 12 September 2016, Stevenson, as well as Cate Blanchett, Chiwetel Ejiofor, Peter Capaldi, Douglas Booth, Neil Gaiman, Keira Knightley, Jesse Eisenberg, Kit Harington and Stanley Tucci, featured in a video from the United Nations' refugee agency UNHCR to help raise awareness of the global refugee crisis. The video, titled "What They Took With Them", has the actors reading a poem written by Jenifer Toksvig and inspired by primary accounts of refugees, and is part of UNHCR's #WithRefugees campaign, which also includes a petition to governments to expand asylum to provide further shelter, integrating job opportunities and education.

Stevenson's friends and frequent collaborators include director Robert Icke, comedian and feminist broadcaster Deborah Frances-White, poet Aviva Dautch and concert pianist Lucy Parham.

Stevenson is also a painter and has talked about how her art has helped her through difficult moments such as lockdown and the death of her stepson.

Filmography

Film

Television

Theatre

Audio recordings 
A partial list of Stevenson's audio recordings:
 Man and Superman, BBC Audiobooks, 1998 (Broadcast on BBC-4 in 1996). Production featured Juliet Stevenson, Ralph Fiennes and Judi Dench. It also included an interview with the director, Peter Hall
 Old Possum's Book of Practical Cats, Penguin Audiobooks, 1997
 The Plague Tales, BDD, c. 1997
 Hamlet by William Shakespeare, BBC Radio Collection, 1999 (with Michael Sheen)
 When Love Speaks (2002, EMI Classics) – "Sonnet 128" ("How oft, when thou, my music ...")
 The Thirteenth Tale by Diane Setterfield, Unabridged, Orion audiobook (2006)
 Northanger Abbey by Jane Austen. Unabridged, Naxos audiobook, 7 CDs (2006)
 Persuasion by Jane Austen. Unabridged, Naxos audiobook, 7 CDs (2007)
 Mansfield Park by Jane Austen. Unabridged, Naxos audiobook, 14 CDs (2007)
 Emma by Jane Austen. Unabridged, Naxos audiobook, 13 CDs (2007)
 Sense and Sensibility by Jane Austen, Naxos audiobook, Unabridged (2007)
 Lady Audley's Secret by Mary Elizabeth Braddon. Abridged, CSA Word Classic, 4 CDs (2007)
 The Tenant of Wildfell Hall by Anne Brontë
 I, Coriander by Sally Gardner,
 The King's General by Daphne du Maurier
 An Unequal Marriage by Emma Tennant
 From Shakespeare with Love by William Shakespeare. David Tennant (narrator), Juliet Stevenson (narrator), Anton Lesser (narrator), Alex Jennings (Narrator)
 Rebecca, Frenchman's Creek & My Cousin Rachel (Daphne du Maurier Collection) by Daphne du Maurier. Juliet Stevenson (narrator), Daniel Massey (narrator), Michael Maloney (narrator)
 A Room with a View by E.M. Forster
 The London Tapes by Juliet Stevenson
 Ancient and Modern by Sue Gee (2004)
 Alentejo Blue by Monica Ali, abridged (2006)
 North and South by Elizabeth Gaskell, unabridged. (2009)
 Middlemarch by George Eliot.  Unabridged. Naxos Audiobooks (2011).
 Goldfish Girl by Peter Souter (2011)
 Mary Poppins by P. L. Travers (2012)
 The Signature of All Things by Elizabeth Gilbert (2013)
 The Golden Notebook by Doris Lessing (2010)
 The Paying Guests by Sarah Waters. Unabridged (2014)
 Apple Tree Yard by Louise Doughty, unabridged (2014)
 Belgravia by Julian Fellowes, (2016)
  A Room of One's Own by Virginia Wolf (1929)

Honours 
In the 1999 Queens Birthday Honours, Stevenson was appointed a Commander of the Order of the British Empire (CBE).

She is a patron of the London International Festival of Theatre.

Awards and nominations

Film

Television

Theatre

References

External links 
 Juliet Stevenson at the British Film Institute
 
 Juliet Stevenson: The Power of Story Telling in The Guardian

AACTA Award winners
Alumni of RADA
Audiobook narrators
Commanders of the Order of the British Empire
English atheists
English film actresses
English radio actresses
English stage actresses
English television actresses
English voice actresses
Laurence Olivier Award winners
People from Kelvedon
Royal Shakespeare Company members
English Shakespearean actresses
1956 births
Living people
People educated at Hurst Lodge School
People educated at St Catherine's School, Bramley
20th-century English actresses
21st-century English actresses
Actresses from Essex